Shashi Bhushan Hazari (1965/6 – 1 July 2021) was an Indian politician from Janata Dal (United). He was elected as a member of the Bihar Legislative Assembly from Kusheshwar Asthan (constituency). On 1 July 2021, Hazari died at Sir Ganga Ram Hospital in New Delhi after suffering from Hepatitis B for a long time.

References 

1960s births
Year of birth uncertain
2021 deaths
21st-century Indian politicians
People from Darbhanga district
Janata Dal (United) politicians
Bihar MLAs 2020–2025
Bihar MLAs 2010–2015
Bihar MLAs 2015–2020